Lake Como is a borough in Monmouth County, New Jersey, United States. As of the 2010 United States Census, the borough's population was 1,759, reflecting a decline of 47 (−2.6%) from the 1,806 counted in the 2000 Census, which had in turn increased by 324 (+21.9%) from the 1,482 counted in the 1990 Census. It is the tenth-smallest municipality in land area in New Jersey.

Lake Como was originally formed as the borough of South Belmar by an act of the New Jersey Legislature on March 12, 1924, from portions of Wall Township, subject to the results of a referendum held on May 6, 1924. On November 2, 2004, voters in the borough approved changing the locality's name to Lake Como, which became effective as of January 4, 2005.

Geography

According to the United States Census Bureau, the borough had a total area of 0.26 square miles (0.67 km2), including 0.25 square miles (0.65 km2) of land and 0.01 square miles (0.02 km2) of water (3.08%).

The borough borders the Monmouth County communities of Belmar, Spring Lake, Spring Lake Heights and Wall Township.

Demographics

Census 2010

The Census Bureau's 2006–2010 American Community Survey showed that (in 2010 inflation-adjusted dollars) median household income was $76,576 (with a margin of error of +/− $8,374) and the median family income was $84,821 (+/− $15,308). Males had a median income of $58,173 (+/− $11,703) versus $49,444 (+/− $25,611) for females. The per capita income for the borough was $37,729 (+/− $5,783). About 10.8% of families and 7.9% of the population were below the poverty line, including 12.5% of those under age 18 and 3.5% of those age 65 or over.

Census 2000

As of the 2000 United States Census there were 1,806 people, 824 households, and 391 families residing in the borough. The population density was 7,322.9 people per square mile (2,789.2/km2). There were 1,107 housing units at an average density of 4,488.6 per square mile (1,709.7/km2). The racial makeup of the borough was 82.17% White, 7.75% African American, 0.44% Native American, 1.27% Asian, 0.06% Pacific Islander, 5.87% from other races, and 2.44% from two or more races. Hispanic or Latino of any race were 10.13% of the population.

There were 824 households, out of which 22.9% had children under the age of 18 living with them, 31.3% were married couples living together, 10.8% had a female householder with no husband present, and 52.5% were non-families. 41.1% of all households were made up of individuals, and 12.3% had someone living alone who was 65 years of age or older. The average household size was 2.19 and the average family size was 3.10.

In the borough the population was spread out, with 21.8% under the age of 18, 8.5% from 18 to 24, 36.7% from 25 to 44, 20.2% from 45 to 64, and 13.0% who were 65 years of age or older. The median age was 36 years. For every 100 females, there were 102.2 males. For every 100 females age 18 and over, there were 97.1 males.

The median income for a household in the borough was $47,566, and the median income for a family was $56,538. Males had a median income of $41,550 versus $27,708 for females. The per capita income for the borough was $27,111. About 4.3% of families and 7.5% of the population were below the poverty line, including 8.2% of those under age 18 and 5.3% of those age 65 or over.

Government

Local government
Lake Como is governed under the Borough form of New Jersey municipal government, which is used in 218 municipalities (of the 564) statewide, making it the most common form of government in New Jersey. The governing body is comprised of the Mayor and the Borough Council, with all positions elected at-large on a partisan basis as part of the November general election. A Mayor is elected directly by the voters to a four-year term of office. The Borough Council is comprised of six members elected to serve three-year terms on a staggered basis, with two seats coming up for election each year in a three-year cycle. The Borough form of government used by Lake Como is a "weak mayor / strong council" government in which council members act as the legislative body with the mayor presiding at meetings and voting only in the event of a tie. The mayor can veto ordinances subject to an override by a two-thirds majority vote of the council. The mayor makes committee and liaison assignments for council members, and most appointments are made by the mayor with the advice and consent of the council.

, the Mayor of Lake Como is Democrat Kevin Higgins, whose term of office ends December 31, 2022. Members of the Borough Council are Council President Douglas E. Witte (D, 2022), Heather Albala-Doyle (2024), Chris D'Antuono (D, 2024), Nicholas DeMauro (D, 2023), Hawley G. Scull (D, 2022) and Peter Ventrice (D, 2023; elected to serve an unexpired term).

In February 2021, the Borough Council considered three candidates whose names were submitted by the Democratic municipal committee and chose Peter Ventrice to fill the seat expiring on December 2023 that had been held by David Gardner until he resigned from office the previous month. Ventrice served on an interim basis until the November 2021 general election, when he was selected to serve the balance of the term of office.

In September 2019, the borough council selected Nicholas DeMauro from a list of three candidates nominated by the Democratic municipal committee to fill the seat expiring in December 2020 that was vacated by John Carvelli after he resigned from office the previous month after announcing that he was moving out of Lake Como.

In September 2018, David Gardner was appointed to fill the seat expiring in December 2020 that had been vacated by Kevin Higgins, who was appointed mayor the previous monthto fill the seat vacated by Brian T. Wilton. Kevin Higgins and David Gardner served and were elected to their respective positions in November 2018. Kevin Higgins was elected to a full four-year term ending December 2022.

In January 2017, Christopher D'Antuono was appointed to fill the seat expiring in December 2018 that was vacated by Michael Noonan; D'Antono will serve on an interim basis until the November 2017 general election, when voters will select a candidate to serve the balance of the term of office.

In January 2015, the Borough Council selected Hawley Scull from three names nominated by the Democratic municipal committee to fill the vacant seat of Patricia A. Tzibrouk expiring in December 2016. In the November 2015 general election, Scull was elected to serve the balance of the term of office.

Later in January 2015, the Borough Council chose Michael Noonan to fill the council seat expiring December 2015 that was vacated when Brian Wilton took office as mayor.

Federal, state and county representation
Lake Como is located in the 4th Congressional District and is part of New Jersey's 30th state legislative district. Prior to the 2011 reapportionment following the 2010 Census, Lake Como had been in the 11th state legislative district.

 

Monmouth County is governed by a Board of County Commissioners comprised of five members who are elected at-large to serve three year terms of office on a staggered basis, with either one or two seats up for election each year as part of the November general election. At an annual reorganization meeting held in the beginning of January, the board selects one of its members to serve as Director and another as Deputy Director. , Monmouth County's Commissioners are
Commissioner Director Thomas A. Arnone (R, Neptune City, term as commissioner and as director ends December 31, 2022), 
Commissioner Deputy Director Susan M. Kiley (R, Hazlet Township, term as commissioner ends December 31, 2024; term as deputy commissioner director ends 2022),
Lillian G. Burry (R, Colts Neck Township, 2023),
Nick DiRocco (R, Wall Township, 2022), and 
Ross F. Licitra (R, Marlboro Township, 2023). 
Constitutional officers elected on a countywide basis are
County clerk Christine Giordano Hanlon (R, 2025; Ocean Township), 
Sheriff Shaun Golden (R, 2022; Howell Township) and 
Surrogate Rosemarie D. Peters (R, 2026; Middletown Township).

Politics
As of March 23, 2011, there were a total of 992 registered voters in Lake Como, of which 301 (30.3%) were registered as Democrats, 151 (15.2%) were registered as Republicans and 539 (54.3%) were registered as Unaffiliated. There was one voter registered to another party.

In the 2012 presidential election, Democrat Barack Obama received 55.8% of the vote (390 cast), ahead of Republican Mitt Romney with 42.2% (295 votes), and other candidates with 2.0% (14 votes), among the 706 ballots cast by the borough's 1,057 registered voters (7 ballots were spoiled), for a turnout of 66.8%. In the 2008 presidential election, Democrat Barack Obama received 57.1% of the vote (459 cast), ahead of Republican John McCain with 39.1% (314 votes) and other candidates with 2.1% (17 votes), among the 804 ballots cast by the borough's 1,123 registered voters, for a turnout of 71.6%. In the 2004 presidential election, Democrat John Kerry received 52.5% of the vote (428 ballots cast), outpolling Republican George W. Bush with 45.8% (374 votes) and other candidates with 1.0% (12 votes), among the 816 ballots cast by the borough's 1,156 registered voters, for a turnout percentage of 70.6.

In the 2013 gubernatorial election, Republican Chris Christie received 64.2% of the vote (298 cast), ahead of Democrat Barbara Buono with 32.3% (150 votes), and other candidates with 3.4% (16 votes), among the 470 ballots cast by the borough's 1,047 registered voters (6 ballots were spoiled), for a turnout of 44.9%. In the 2009 gubernatorial election, Republican Chris Christie received 49.1% of the vote (262 ballots cast), ahead of  Democrat Jon Corzine with 40.3% (215 votes), Independent Chris Daggett with 8.8% (47 votes) and other candidates with 0.7% (4 votes), among the 534 ballots cast by the borough's 1,048 registered voters, yielding a 51.0% turnout.

Education

The Belmar School District serves students in public school for pre-kindergarten through eighth grade at Belmar Elementary School. The district serves both Belmar and Lake Como, a non-operating district. As of the 2018–2019 school year, the district, comprised of one school, had an enrollment of 471 students and 51.6 classroom teachers (on an FTE basis), for a student–teacher ratio of 9.1:1. Students from Lake Como attend as part of a sending/receiving relationship. The single facility is two schools in one, a primary school for grades preschool through fifth and a middle school organization plan for grades six through eight.

Students attending public high school are assigned based on sending/receiving relationships to either Manasquan High School in Manasquan or Asbury Park High School in Asbury Park, as part of a plan in which 56% of students re assigned to attend high school in Mansquan and 44% are sent to Asbury Park. Manasquan High School also serves students from Avon-by-the-Sea, Brielle, Sea Girt, Spring Lake, Spring Lake Heights who attend Manasquan High School as part of sending/receiving relationships with their respective districts. As of the 2018–2019 school year, Manasquan High School had an enrollment of 969 students and 72.9 classroom teachers (on an FTE basis), for a student–teacher ratio of 13.3:1, while Asbury Park High School had an enrollment of 420 students and 38.5 classroom teachers (on an FTE basis), for a student–teacher ratio of 10.9:1.

Public school students may also attend Red Bank Regional High School, Marine Academy of Science and Technology, Academy of Allied Health & Science, Academy Charter School, High Technology High School, Communications High School or Biotechnology High School. They also have the option to attend Academy Charter High School in Lake Como, which accepts students on a lottery basis from the communities of Allenhurst, Asbury Park, Avon-by-the-Sea, Belmar, Bradley Beach, Deal, Interlaken and Lake Como.

Transportation

Roads and highways

No major highways pass directly through the borough. The most significant roads are minor county routes, such as County Route 30, which serves as Main Street. However, several highways are accessible in neighboring communities, such as Route 35 in both Belmar and Wall, as well as Route 18, Route 34, Route 138, the Garden State Parkway and I-195 all in Wall Township.

Public transportation
NJ Transit offers service to and from Philadelphia on the 317 route and local bus service on the 830 route.

Notable people

People who were born in, residents of, or otherwise closely associated with Lake Como include:

 Walter McAfee (1914–1995), African-American scientist and astronomer, who participated in the world's first lunar radar echo experiments as part of Project Diana

References

External links

 Borough of Lake Como official website
 Belmar Elementary School
 
 School Data for the Belmar Elementary School, National Center for Education Statistics

 
1924 establishments in New Jersey
Borough form of New Jersey government
Boroughs in Monmouth County, New Jersey
Populated places established in 1924